Basanta Bilap is a 1973 Indian Bengali language Romantic comedy film directed by Dinen Gupta, based on a story by writer Bimal Kar.

Plot
The story revolves around a group of girls (4 of them are focussed mainly), all boarders of a working ladies' hostel Basanta Bilap, and a group of 4 boys from the neighborhood, a series of hilarious clashes between them eventually leading to their romance.

Cast
 Soumitra Chatterjee as Shyam Sundar Bose aka Shyam, leader of the boys
 Aparna Sen as Anuradha Singha aka Radha, leader of the girls
 Rabi Ghosh as Gupto
 Kajal Gupta as Parbati aka Paro
 Anup Kumar as Lalit aka Lalu
 Sumitra Mukherjee as Nabanita aka Nita
 Chinmoy Roy as Siddheswar Bandapadhyay aka Sidhu
 Sibani Bose as Aalo Ray
 Amarnath Mukherjee as Ajay, Lalu's elder brother
 Kanika Majumdar as Ajay's wife, and a mediator between the two groups
 Tarun Kumar Chatterjee as Dr. Girija Sapui, a homeopathy doctor
 Gita Dey as Sidhu's Aunty(Kakima)
 Haridhan Mukhopadhyay as the tenant/landlord of Basanta Bilap

Soundtrack

All music is composed by Sudhin Dasgupta.

References

External links
 

1973 comedy films
1973 films
Indian comedy films
Bengali-language Indian films
1970s Bengali-language films
Films based on Indian novels